Nigel Tier (born 1958), is a retired male badminton player from England.

Career
He won the bronze medal at the 1985 IBF World Championships in mixed doubles with Gillian Gowers.

Tier represented England and won a gold medal in the team event and a silver medal in the men's doubles with Andy Goode, at the 1986 Commonwealth Games in Edinburgh, Scotland.

References

 European results
 English statistics

External links
 

1958 births
Living people
English male badminton players
Badminton players at the 1986 Commonwealth Games
Commonwealth Games gold medallists for England
Commonwealth Games silver medallists for England
Commonwealth Games medallists in badminton
Medallists at the 1986 Commonwealth Games